Jennifer Beals (born December 19, 1963) is an American actress and former teen model. She made her film debut in My Bodyguard (1980), before receiving critical acclaim for her role in Flashdance (1983), for which she won NAACP Image Award for Outstanding Actress in a Motion Picture and was nominated for a Golden Globe Award for Best Actress – Motion Picture Comedy or Musical.

Beals has appeared in several notable films including Devil in a Blue Dress (1995), The Last Days of Disco (1998), Roger Dodger (2002), The Book of Eli (2010), and Before I Fall (2017). On television, she starred as Bette Porter on the Showtime drama series The L Word (2004–2009) and later went on to star in the series The Chicago Code (2011), Proof (2015), Taken (2017), and The Book of Boba Fett (2021). She reprised her role as Bette Porter in The L Word: Generation Q beginning in December 2019.

Early life
Beals was born and raised in the South Side of Chicago, Illinois, the daughter of Jeanne, an elementary school teacher, and Alfred Beals, who owned grocery stores. Beals' father was African-American, and her mother is Irish-American. She has two brothers, Bobby and Gregory. Her father died when Beals was nine, after which she spent a summer at Cheley Colorado Camps in Estes Park, Colorado. Her mother married Edward Cohen in 1981. Beals says her biracial heritage affected her... she "always lived sort of on the outside", with an idea "of being the other in society". She got her first job at the age of 13 at an ice cream store, using her height at the time (she is now ) to convince her boss she was 16.

She was inspired to become an actress by two events: working on a high school production of Fiddler on the Roof and seeing Balm in Gilead with Joan Allen while volunteer-ushering at the Steppenwolf Theatre.

Beals graduated from Francis W. Parker School, then participated in Goodman Theatre Young People's Drama Workshop. She graduated from Yale University with a B.A. in American Literature in 1987. She deferred a term so she could film Flashdance. While at Yale, Beals was a resident of Morse College.

Career

Film

Beals had a minor role in the 1980 film My Bodyguard, then came to fame with her starring part in Flashdance. The third-highest grossing U.S. film of 1983, Flashdance is the story of 18-year-old Alex, a welder by day and sensual dancer by night, whose dream is to be accepted someday at an illustrious school of dance. Beals was cast for this key role while still a student at Yale. She was nominated for a Golden Globe and the film received an Academy Award for Best Song. Many of Beals's elaborate dance moves were actually performed by dance double Marine Jahan. Gymnast Sharon Shapiro performed the flips as a body double for actress Beals.

After she filmed Flashdance, Beals resumed her studies, making only one film during that time: playing the titular character The Bride with singer-actor Sting, a gothic horror film loosely based on the 1935 classic Bride of Frankenstein, shot during her summer break. She also appeared as Cinderella in the eponymous episode of Faerie Tale Theatre, opposite Matthew Broderick. Beals was asked by Joel Schumacher to do St. Elmo's Fire but turned it down, preferring to stay at Yale.

After graduating from Yale in 1987, Beals resumed her acting career, playing the love interest in the boxing film Split Decisions opposite Craig Sheffer. Starring opposite Nicolas Cage, she portrayed a lusty and thirsty vampire in 1989's Vampire's Kiss.

In 1995, Beals and Denzel Washington co-starred in Devil in a Blue Dress, a period film based on a Walter Mosley novel featuring L.A. private detective, Easy Rawlins. Beals plays a biracial woman passing for white. That same year she appeared with Tim Roth in two segments of the four-story anthology Four Rooms, one of which was directed by her then-husband, Alexandre Rockwell.

Rockwell had previously directed her in the 1992 independent film In the Soup, which was a Grand Prize winner at the Sundance Film Festival. In 2003, she played one of the sequestered jury members in the film adaptation of Runaway Jury.

She had a leading role in 2006's The Grudge 2, sequel to the hit horror film of two years earlier. In 2010, Beals reunited with Denzel Washington in the post-apocalyptic action drama The Book of Eli, where she played a blind woman who is the mother of Mila Kunis' character and a consort of a local despot played by Gary Oldman.

Beals portrayed UCLA Bruins gymnastics head coach Valorie Kondos Field, in the Full Out movie about Ariana Berlin.

In 2017, the actress played the role of Samantha Kingston's mother, in the film version of Before I Fall.

In 2019, she played the role of Karen in the romance movie After.

Television

In 1992, she appeared in 2000 Malibu Road as attorney Perry Quinn. It was her first television series; she said she had been leery as she previously had not "found a character I wanted to live with for several years".

In 2004, Beals made a brief cameo in the final episode of Frasier. In 2007, she appeared in the small TV drama My Name Is Sarah, in which she plays Sarah Winston, a sober woman who joins Alcoholics Anonymous to conduct research for her book but finds herself falling in love with a recovering alcoholic and—as a result—having to deal with her original deception in joining the group.

Beals starred in Showtime's The L Word, wherein she played Bette Porter, an Ivy League-educated lesbian. At Beals's request, Bette was made biracial, enabling Pam Grier's Kit Porter character to become Bette's half-sister. Beals's initial research for the part focused more on the woman's profession as an art museum director than on her life as a lesbian; "I was much more obsessed by the work that Bette did, because she was so obsessed by the work that she did." The series ran for six seasons and ended in March 2009.

She also appears alongside Tim Roth in Lie to Me, as Cal Lightman's ex-wife, Zoe Landau.

Beals was the female lead in Fox's TV drama The Chicago Code. Her character Teresa Colvin is Chicago's first female police superintendent. The series was canceled after its first season.

Beals turned down an offer to appear on Dancing with the Stars, saying: "I am not a dancer. They asked me and I said 'no.' You could back up a truck to my door filled with cash and I wouldn't do it."

In 2013, Beals signed on for the main role of the ABC drama pilot Westside produced by McG and developed by Ilene Chaiken.

On March 10, 2014, it was announced that Beals would star as Dr. Kathryn Russo in Proof, a TNT supernatural medical drama about a hard-nosed surgeon, struggling with the loss of her teenage son, who begins to investigate that there may be life after death. The series ran from June 16 through August 18, 2015, and was produced by Kyra Sedgwick.

On February 27, 2017, Beals played the leader of a small group of specially trained government operatives for the new series Taken, which serves as a prequel to the Taken film series.

In September 2018, Beals was cast in the role of Sheriff Lucilia Cable for the Swamp Thing series.

In December 2019, Beals reprised her role as Bette Porter in The L Word: Generation Q, the sequel series to The L Word, and also executive-produces the show. She stars alongside fellow The L Word cast members, Katherine Moennig and Leisha Hailey.

In December 2021, Beals appeared in the series premiere of The Book of Boba Fett, a Disney+ series in the Star Wars franchise, where she portrays the Twi'lek Garsa Fwip.

In 2022, Beals appeared as art gallery owner Cassandra Webb in the NBC series Law & Order: Organized Crime for five episodes.

Web series
Beals is also well known for her support of women's rights. In August 2012, she appeared alongside Troian Bellisario in the web series Lauren on the YouTube channel WIGS. Its first season is a three-episode arc featuring the stories of women in the army being abused, predominantly by more powerful superiors. The stories focused on frequently unreported cases of sexual abuse and how and why most of the cases went unreported or unsettled. Beals has also appeared in two interviews, discussing her views in relation to Lauren.

In January 2013, Troian Bellisario confirmed on her Twitter and Instagram that she and Beals were filming more Lauren web episodes. Lauren returned on May 3, 2013, with a second season of 12 episodes.

Personal life
While attending Yale, Beals dated future film executive Robert Simonds. She married Alexandre Rockwell in 1986, before divorcing in 1996. In 1998, she married Ken Dixon, a Canadian entrepreneur. On October 18, 2005, Beals gave birth to their daughter. Dixon also has two children from a previous marriage.

Beals has described herself as a spiritual person. She has expressed interest in the Bible and Catholicism, as well as Judaism, to which she once considered converting, and is a practicing Buddhist.

She has been a vocal advocate for gay rights, saying, "I think after playing Bette Porter on The L Word for six years I felt like an honorary member of the community." Beals was a Celebrity Grand Marshal at the 2006 San Francisco Pride Parade. In October 2012, she received the Human Rights Campaign's Ally For Equality Award, in recognition of her outstanding support for the lesbian, gay, bisexual, and transgender community.

Beals is a practitioner of kung-fu, sanshou, and kickboxing, and is a triathlete.

Beals is a photographer and has had shows featuring her work under her married name, Dixon. In 1989, she spent some time in Haiti photographing the elections. She published a book about her time on The L Word featuring her own photographs.

In 2010, Beals served as the Grand Marshal of the McDonald's Thanksgiving Parade in Chicago, during which she spoke of the two charities important to her: the Matthew Shepard Foundation and the Pablove Foundation.

Filmography

Film

Television

As producer

Awards and nominations

References

External links

 

1963 births
20th-century American actresses
21st-century American actresses
Actresses from Chicago
African-American actresses
African-American Buddhists
African-American female models
American Buddhists
American female triathletes
American film actresses
American people of Irish descent
American television actresses
American voice actresses
Converts to Buddhism
Converts to Buddhism from Christianity
American LGBT rights activists
Living people
Yale College alumni
20th-century African-American women
20th-century African-American people
21st-century African-American women
20th-century American Buddhists
21st-century American Buddhists
Francis W. Parker School (Chicago) alumni